Drake London (born July 24, 2001) is an American football wide receiver for the Atlanta Falcons of the National Football League (NFL). He played college football at USC and was selected eighth overall by the Falcons in the 2022 NFL Draft.

Early years
London attended Moorpark High School in Moorpark, California. He played football and basketball in high school. As a senior on the football team, he had 62 receptions for 1,089 yards and 12 touchdowns. As a senior in basketball he averaged 29.2 points, 11.9 rebounds and 3.8 assists per game. London committed to the University of Southern California (USC) to play both football and basketball.

College career
As a true freshman in football, London started nine of 13 games, recording 39 receptions for 567 yards and five touchdowns. As a freshman in basketball, he played in three games and had three rebounds. He returned to the football team as a sophomore in 2020 as one of the team's top receivers. London was named the Pac-12 Offensive Player of the Year in 2021. During Southern Cal's eighth game of the 2021 season, London fractured his right ankle, forcing him to miss the rest of the year. London declared for the 2022 NFL Draft following the season.

College statistics

Professional career
 
London was selected eight overall by the Atlanta Falcons in the 2022 NFL Draft. He was the first wide receiver taken. 

London made his NFL debut in Week 1 against the New Orleans Saints where he had five receptions for 74 yards. In Week 2 against the Los Angeles Rams, London had a season-high eight receptions for 86 yards and recorded his first professional touchdown on a four-yard reception from Marcus Mariota. In Week 18 against the Tampa Bay Buccaneers, London recorded his first 100-yard receiving game in the NFL, having six receptions for 120 yards, including a season-long 40 yard reception, in the 30–17 win.

London finished his rookie season with 72 receptions for 866 yards and four touchdowns. London's 72 catches set a new rookie reception record for the Falcons, surpassing the mark previously set by Kyle Pitts.

NFL career statistics

References

External links
 Atlanta Falcons bio
USC Trojans bio

2001 births
Living people
People from Moorpark, California
Players of American football from California
Sportspeople from Ventura County, California
American football wide receivers
USC Trojans football players
USC Trojans men's basketball players
Atlanta Falcons players